Reginald H. "Reggie" Phillips (born 1953) was a Republican member of the Illinois House of Representatives who represented the 110th district. He was sworn into office in January 2015. During his tenure, the 110th district, located in Downstate Illinois, includes Coles, Cumberland, Clark, Crawford and Lawrence counties.

On September 22, 2017, Phillips announced he would not run for a third term. He was succeeded by Republican Chris Miller.

References

External links

1953 births
Living people
People from Charleston, Illinois
Republican Party members of the Illinois House of Representatives
21st-century American politicians